Valter Manuel Pereira da Costa (born 25 November 1949, in Barreiro) is a former Portuguese footballer who played as midfielder.

Football career 

Costa gained 1 cap for Portugal, on  3 April 1974 in Lisbon against England, in a 0-0 draw.

External links 
 
 

1949 births
Living people
Sportspeople from Barreiro, Portugal
Portuguese footballers
Association football midfielders
Primeira Liga players
Sporting CP footballers
C.S. Marítimo players
Portimonense S.C. players
C.F. Estrela da Amadora players
Portugal international footballers